Golden Harvest is a 1933 American Pre-Code drama film directed by Ralph Murphy and written by Nina Wilcox Putnam and Casey Robinson. The film stars Richard Arlen, Chester Morris, Genevieve Tobin, Roscoe Ates, Julie Haydon, Elizabeth Patterson and Berton Churchill. The film was released on September 22, 1933, by Paramount Pictures.

Plot
An ambitious grain trader Chris Martin (Chester Morris), who through fair and foul means corners the wheat market and becomes a millionaire. Outgrowing his humble farm beginnings, Chris makes a bid for respectability by marrying Chicago socialite Cynthia Flint (Genevieve Tobin). Meanwhile, Chris's ex-sweetheart Ellen (Julie Haydon) marries his down-to-earth brother Walt (Richard Arlen), who has chosen to remain on the family farm. Inevitably, the two brothers find themselves on opposite sides when Chris's greed overtakes his common sense.

Cast 
Richard Arlen as Walt Martin
Chester Morris as Chris Martin
Genevieve Tobin as Cynthia Flint
Roscoe Ates as Louis Jenkins
Julie Haydon as Ellen Goodhue
Elizabeth Patterson as Lydia
Berton Churchill as Eben Martin
Lawrence Gray as Hugh Jackson 
Henry Kolker as Henry Flint
Richard Carle as Doctor Hoyt
Charles Sellon as Jason Bowers
Frederick Burton as Judge Goodhue

References

External links 
 

1933 films
American drama films
1933 drama films
Paramount Pictures films
Films directed by Ralph Murphy
American black-and-white films
1930s English-language films
1930s American films